"God Only Knows" is a 1966 song by the Beach Boys.

God Only Knows may also refer to:
"God Only Knows" (1954 song), a song by the Capris
"God Only Knows", a track by Cornelius from the 1997 album Fantasma
"God Only Knows" (MKTO song), 2013
"God Only Knows" (For King & Country song), 2018
By the Gun, a 2014 American film formerly known as God Only Knows
God Only Knows (2019 film), a Dutch language arthouse film